Dede Eri Supria is an Indonesian Social Realist painter. Born in Jakarta on January 29, 1956, he studied in SSRI Yoga.

His works often include scenes of struggle of the poor in urban centers.

Awards 

 General Award for The Arts from The Society For American Indonesia Friendship Inc. (1978)
 The International Visitor's Program from USIS, USA (1981)
 Anugerah Adam Malik (1986)
 Affandi Award (1993)

External links

Dede Eri Supria: Urban chronicles (1994) Excerpt from Astri Wright’s book Soul, spirit and mountain: Preoccupations of contemporary Indonesian painters.

References

1956 births
Living people
Indonesian painters
Social realist artists